Obukhivka is an urban-type settlement in Dnipro Raion of Dnipropetrovsk Oblast in Ukraine. Until 2016, the settlement was known as Kirovske. It was renamed Obukhivka by Verkhovna Rada according to the law prohibiting names of Communist origin. Obukhivka is a suburb of Dnipro and is located on the left bank of the Dnieper. It hosts the administration of Obukhivka settlement hromada, one of the hromadas of Ukraine. Population: 

The kindergarten, built in 2018, was nominated in February 2020 by the organizers of the Mies van der Rohe Award for the EU Prize in Contemporary Architecture.

Economy

Transportation
The closest passenger railway station is in Dnipro.

Obukhivka is on Highway H31 which connects Dnipro and Reshetylivka.

References

Urban-type settlements in Dnipro Raion
Populated places on the Dnieper in Ukraine